Matteo Ricci, SJ (6 October 1552 – 11 May 1610), was an Italian Jesuit priest and one of the founding figures of the Jesuit China missions. On the 17 December 2022 the Apostolic See declared its recognition of Ricci’s ‘heroic virtues’, thereby bestowing upon him the honorific of Venerable.

Ricci arrived at the Portuguese settlement of Macau in 1582 where he began his missionary work in China. He became the first European to enter the Forbidden City of Beijing in 1601 when invited by the Wanli Emperor, who sought his services in matters such as court astronomy and calendrical science. He converted several prominent Chinese officials to Catholicism. He also worked with several Chinese elites, such as Xu Guangqi, in translating Euclid's Elements into Chinese as well as the Confucian classics into Latin for the first time in history.

Early life 
Ricci was born 6 October 1552 in Macerata, part of the Papal States and today a city in the Italian region of Marche. He studied the classics in his native hometown and studied law at Rome for two years. He entered the Society of Jesus in April 1571 at the Roman College. While there, in addition to philosophy and theology, he also studied mathematics, cosmology, and astronomy under the direction of Christopher Clavius. In 1577, he applied for a missionary expedition to the Far East. He sailed from Lisbon, Portugal, in March 1578 and arrived in Goa, a Portuguese colony, the following September. Ricci remained employed in teaching and the ministry there until the end of Lent 1582, when he was summoned to Macau to prepare to enter China. Ricci arrived at Macau in the early part of August.

Ricci in China 

In August 1582, Ricci arrived at Macau, a Portuguese trading post on the South China Sea. At the time, Christian missionary activity in China was almost completely limited to Macau, where some of the local Chinese people had converted to Christianity. Three years before, Michele Ruggieri was invited from Portuguese India expressly to study Chinese, by Alessandro Valignano, founder of St. Paul Jesuit College (Macau), and to prepare for the Jesuits' mission from Macau into Mainland China.

Once in Macau, Ricci studied the Chinese language and customs. It was the beginning of a long project that made him one of the first Western scholars to master Chinese script and Classical Chinese. With Ruggieri, he traveled to Guangdong's major cities, Canton and Zhaoqing (then the residence of the Viceroy of Guangdong and Guangxi), seeking to establish a permanent Jesuit mission outside Macau.

In 1583, Ricci and Ruggieri settled in Zhaoqing, at the invitation of the governor of Zhaoqing, Wang Pan, who had heard of Ricci's skill as a mathematician and cartographer. Ricci stayed in Zhaoqing from 1583 to 1589, when he was expelled by a new viceroy. It was in Zhaoqing, in 1584, that Ricci composed the first European-style world map in Chinese, called "Da Ying Quan Tu". No prints of the 1584 map are known to exist, but, of the much improved and expanded Kunyu Wanguo Quantu of 1602, six recopied, rice-paper versions survive.

It is thought that, during their time in Zhaoqing, Ricci and Ruggieri compiled a Portuguese-Chinese dictionary, the first in any European language, for which they developed a system for transcribing Chinese words in the Latin alphabet. The manuscript was misplaced in the Jesuit Archives in Rome, rediscovered only in 1934, and published only in 2001.

There is now a memorial plaque in Zhaoqing to commemorate Ricci's six-year stay there, as well as a "Ricci Memorial Centre" in a building dating from the 1860s.

Expelled from Zhaoqing in 1588, Ricci obtained permission to relocate to Shaoguan (Shaozhou, in Ricci's account) in the north of the province, and reestablish his mission there.

Further travels saw Ricci reach Nanjing (Ming's southern capital) and Nanchang in 1595. In August 1597, Alessandro Valignano (1539–1606), his superior, appointed him Major Superior of the mission in China, with the rank and powers of a Provincial, a charge that he fulfilled until his death. He moved to Tongzhou (a port of Beijing) in 1598, and first reached the capital Beijing itself on 7 September 1598. However, because of a Chinese intervention against Japanese invasion of Korea at the time, Ricci could not reach the Imperial Palace. After waiting for two months, he left Beijing; first for Nanjing and then Suzhou in Southern Zhili Province.

During the winter of 1598, Ricci, with the help of his Jesuit colleague Lazzaro Cattaneo, compiled another Chinese-Portuguese dictionary, in which tones in Chinese syllables were indicated in Roman text with diacritical marks. Unlike Ricci's and Ruggieri's earlier Portuguese-Chinese dictionary, this work has not been found.

In 1601, Ricci was invited to become an adviser to the imperial court of the Wanli Emperor, the first Westerner to be invited into the Forbidden City. This honor was in recognition of Ricci's scientific abilities, chiefly his predictions of solar eclipses, which were significant events in the Chinese world. He established the Cathedral of the Immaculate Conception in Beijing, the oldest Catholic church in the city. Ricci was given free access to the Forbidden City but never met the reclusive Wanli Emperor, who, however, granted him patronage, with a generous stipend and supported Ricci's completion of the Zhifang Waiji, China's first global atlas.

Once established in Beijing, Ricci was able to meet important officials and leading members of the Beijing cultural scene and convert a number of them to Christianity.
 
Ricci was also the first European to learn about the Kaifeng Jews, being contacted by a member of that community who was visiting Beijing in 1605. Ricci never visited Kaifeng, Henan Province, but he sent a junior missionary there in 1608, the first of many such missions. In fact, the elderly Chief Rabbi of the Jews was ready to cede his power to Ricci, as long as he gave up eating pork, but Ricci never accepted the position.

Ricci died on 11 May 1610, in Beijing, aged 57. By the code of the Ming Dynasty, foreigners who died in China had to be buried in Macau. Diego de Pantoja made a special plea to the court, requesting a burial plot in Beijing, in the light of Ricci's contributions to China. The Wanli Emperor granted this request and designated a Buddhist temple for the purpose. In October 1610, Ricci's remains were transferred there. The graves of Ferdinand Verbiest, Johann Adam Schall von Bell, and other missionaries are also there, and it became known as the Zhalan Cemetery, which is today located within the campus of the Beijing Administrative College, in Xicheng District, Beijing.

Ricci was succeeded as Provincial Superior of the China mission by Nicolò Longobardo in 1610. Longobardo entrusted another Jesuit, Nicolas Trigault, with expanding and editing, as well as translating into Latin, those of Ricci's papers that were found in his office after his death. This work was first published in 1615 in Augsburg as De Christiana expeditione apud Sinas and soon was translated into a number of other European languages.

Ricci's approach to Chinese culture 

Ricci could speak Chinese as well as read and write classical Chinese, the literary language of scholars and officials. He was known for his appreciation of Chinese culture in general but condemned the prostitution which was widespread in Beijing at the time. He also called the Chinese "barbarians" in letters back home to his friends, and opposed what he considered to be anti-Black prejudice among the populace. He noted this, however, in the context of his function as a slave catcher for the Portuguese. (Ricci himself also owned a number of African slaves.)

During his research, he discovered that in contrast to the cultures of South Asia, Chinese culture was strongly intertwined with Confucian values and therefore decided to use existing Chinese concepts to explain Christianity. With his superior Valignano's formal approval, he aligned himself with the Confucian intellectually elite literati, and even adopted their mode of dress. He did not explain the Catholic faith as entirely foreign or new; instead, he said that the Chinese culture and people always believed in God and that Christianity is simply the completion of their faith. He borrowed an unusual Chinese term, Tiānzhǔ ("Lord of Heaven") to describe the God of Abraham, despite the term's origin in traditional Chinese worship of Heaven. (He also cited many synonyms from the Confucian Classics.) He supported Chinese traditions by agreeing with the veneration of family ancestors. Dominican and Franciscan missionaries considered this an unacceptable accommodation, and later appealed to the Vatican on the issue. This Chinese rites controversy continued for centuries, with the most recent Vatican statement as recently as 1939. Some contemporary authors have praised Ricci as an exemplar of beneficial inculturation, avoiding at the same time distorting the Gospel message or neglecting the indigenous cultural media.

Like developments in India, the identification of European culture with Christianity led almost to the end of Catholic missions in China, but Christianity continued to grow in Sichuan and some other locations.

Xu Guangqi and Ricci become the first two to translate some of the Confucian classics into a western language, Latin.
 
Ricci also met a Korean emissary to China, teaching the basic tenets of Catholicism and donating several books. Along with João Rodrigues's gifts to the ambassador Jeong Duwon in 1631, Ricci's gifts influenced the creation of Korea's Silhak movement.

Cause of canonization 
The cause of his beatification, originally begun in 1984, was reopened on 24 January 2010, at the cathedral of the Italian diocese of Macerata-Tolentino-Recanati-Cingoli-Treia. Bishop Claudio Giuliodori, the apostolic administrator of the Diocese of Macerata, formally closed the diocesan phase of the sainthood process on 10 May 2013. The cause moved to the Congregation for the Causes of Saints at the Vatican in 2014. Pope Francis issued a decree on December 17, 2022 that Fr. Ricci had lived a life of heroic virtue, thus conferring on him the title of Venerable.

Commemoration 
The following places and institutions are named after Matteo Ricci:
 Matteo Ricci Pacific Studies Reading Room at The National Central Library of Taiwan
Ricci Hall, a dormitory at The University of Hong Kong
Ricci Building, a building at Wah Yan College, Kowloon in Hong Kong
The Matteo Ricci Study Hall, at the Ateneo de Manila University
Matteo Ricci College, Kowloon in Hong Kong
 Matteo Ricci College, at Seattle University
 Colégio Mateus Ricci, Macau
Sekolah Katolik Ricci 1 and 2 in Jakarta, Indonesia
Taipei Ricci Institute, Taiwan
Macau Ricci Institute, Macau
Ricci Institute for Chinese-Western Cultural History at Boston College.
The Matteo Ricci Seminar at Fordham University
Centro Matteo Ricci, a center for refugees and asylum seekers run by the Italian branch of the Jesuit Refugee Service in Rome, Italy
Matteo Ricci Hall-"R" Hall, Ricci Hall Annex-"RA" Hall, two buildings at Sogang University in Seoul, South Korea
In the run-up to the 400th anniversary of Ricci's death, the Vatican Museums hosted a major exhibit dedicated to his life. Additionally, Italian film director Gjon Kolndrekaj produced a 60-minute documentary about Ricci, released in 2009, titled Matteo Ricci: A Jesuit in the Dragon's Kingdom, filmed in Italy and China.

In Taipei, the Taipei Ricci Institute and the National Central Library of Taiwan opened jointly the Matteo Ricci Pacific Studies Reading Room and the Taipei-based
online magazine eRenlai, directed by Jesuit Benoît Vermander, dedicated its June 2010 issue to the commemoration of the 400th anniversary of Ricci's death.

Works

The True Meaning of the Lord of Heaven 
The True Meaning of the Lord of Heaven (天主實義) is a book written by Ricci, which argues that Confucianism and Christianity are not opposed and in fact are remarkably similar in key respects. It was written in the form of a dialogue, originally in Chinese. Ricci used the treatise in his missionary effort to convert Chinese literati, men who were educated in Confucianism and the Chinese classics. In the Chinese Rites controversy, some Roman-Catholic missionaries raised the question whether Ricci and other Jesuits had gone too far and changed Christian beliefs to win converts.

Peter Phan argues that True Meaning was used by a Jesuit missionary to Vietnam, Alexandre de Rhodes, in writing a catechism for Vietnamese Christians. In 1631, Girolamo Maiorica and Bernardino Reggio, both Jesuit missionaries to Vietnam, started a short-lived press in Thăng Long (present-day Hanoi) to print copies of True Meaning and other texts. The book was also influential on later Protestant missionaries to China, James Legge and Timothy Richard, and through them John Nevius, John Ross, and William Edward Soothill, all influential in establishing Protestantism in China and Korea.

Other works 

De Christiana expeditione apud Sinas: the journals of Ricci that were completed and translated into Latin by another Jesuit, Nicolas Trigault, soon after Ricci's death. Available in various editions:
Trigault, Nicolas S. J. "China in the Sixteenth Century: The Journals of Mathew Ricci: 1583-1610". English translation by Louis J. Gallagher, S.J. (New York: Random House, Inc. 1953)
 On Chinese Government, an excerpt from Chapter One of Gallagher's translation
 De Christiana expeditione apud Sinas, full Latin text, available on Google Books
 A discourse of the Kingdome of China, taken out of Ricius and Trigautius, containing the countrey, people, government, religion, rites, sects, characters, studies, arts, acts; and a Map of China added, drawne out of one there made with Annotations for the understanding thereof (an early English translation of excerpts from De Christiana expeditione) in Purchas his Pilgrimes (1625). Can be found in the "Hakluytus posthumus". The book also appears on Google Books, but only in snippet view.
 An excerpt from The Art of Printing  by Matteo Ricci
 Ricci's On Friendship published in Chinese in 1595, translated to English in 2009.
 Ricci's World Map of 1602
 Rare 1602 World Map, the First Map in Chinese to Show the Americas, on Display at Library of Congress, 12 Jan to 10 April 2010
 The Chinese translation of the ancient Greek mathematical treatise Euclid's Elements (幾何原本), published and printed in 1607 by Matteo Ricci and his Chinese colleague Xu Guangqi

See also

References

Citations

Sources 

 Dehergne, Joseph, S.J. (1973). Répertoire des Jésuites de Chine de 1552 à 1800. Rome: Institutum Historicum S.I. OCLC 462805295
 Hsia, R. Po-chia. (2007). "The Catholic Mission and translations in China, 1583–1700" in Cultural Translation in Early Modern Europe (Peter Burke and R. Po-chia Hsia, eds.). Cambridge: Cambridge University Press.  ; OCLC 76935903
 Spence, Jonathan D. (1984). The Memory Palace of Matteo Ricci. New York: Viking. ; OCLC 230623792
 Vito Avarello, L'oeuvre italienne de Matteo Ricci: anatomie d'une rencontre chinoise, Paris, Classiques Garnier, 2014, 738 pages.

Further reading 
 Cronin, Vincent. (1955). The Wise Man from the West: Matteo Ricci and his Mission to China. (1955). OCLC 664953 N.B.: A convenient paperback reissue of this study was published in 1984 by Fount Paperbacks, .
 Gernet, Jacques. (1981). China and the Christian Impact: a conflict of cultures. Cambridge: Cambridge University Press.  ; OCLC 21173711
 George L. Harris, "The Mission of Matteo Ricci, S.J.: A Case Study of an Effort at Guided Culture Change in China in The Sixteenth Century", in Monumenta Serica, Vol. XXV, 1966 (168 pp.).
 Simon Leys, Madness of the Wise: Ricci in China, an article from his book, The Burning Forest (1983). This is an interesting account, and contains a critical review of The Memory Palace by Jonathan D. Spence.
 Mao Weizhun, « European influences on Chinese humanitarian practices. A longitudinal study » in: Emulations - Journal of young scholars in Social Sciences, n°7 (June 2010).
  This book explains Matteo Ricci's world map of 1574.
 《利瑪竇世界地圖研究》(A Study of Matteo Ricci's World Map), book in Chinese by HUANG Shijian and GONG Yingyan (黃時鑒 龔纓晏), 上海古籍出版社 (Shanghai Ancient Works Publishing House), 2004年,

External links 

Inculturation: Matteo Ricci's Legacy in China [Short videos from Georgetown's Ricci Legacy Symposium.]
University of Scranton: Matteo Ricci, S.J.
The Zhaoqing Ricci Center
Article about the tomb of Matteo Ricci in Beijing
Ricci Institute for Chinese-Western Cultural History 
Rotary Club Macerata Matteo Ricci (in Italian)
Matteo Ricci moves closer toward beatification

1552 births
1610 deaths
16th-century Italian Jesuits
16th-century Italian mathematicians
16th-century Italian writers
16th-century male writers
17th-century Italian writers
17th-century Italian male writers
17th-century Italian cartographers
17th-century Italian mathematicians
17th-century Italian Jesuits
17th-century translators
Catholic clergy scientists
Chinese–Italian translators
Italian emigrants to China
Italian Roman Catholic missionaries
Italian venerated Catholics
Italian sinologists
Italian–Latin translators
Jesuit missionaries in China
Jesuit scientists
Latin–Italian translators
Missionary linguists
People from Macerata
Translators from Chinese
Venerated Catholics by Pope Francis